Helston is a town and civil parish in Cornwall, England, United Kingdom. Helston is the most southerly town on the island of Great Britain and is around  farther south than Penzance. The population in 2011 was 11,700.

The former stannary and cattle market town is best known for the annual Furry Dance (known locally as the Flora Dance), said to originate from the medieval period. However, the Hal-an-Tow is reputed to be of Celtic origin. The associated song and music, The Floral Dance, is known to have been written in 1911. In 2001, the town celebrated the 800th anniversary of the granting of its Charter.

History

The name comes from the Cornish 'hen lis' or 'old court' and 'ton' added later to denote a Saxon manor; the Domesday Book refers to Henliston (which survives as the name of a road in the town). Only one edition refers to 'Henlistona'. It was granted its charter by King John on 15 April 1201, for the price of forty marks of silver. It was here that tin ingots were weighed to determine the tin coinage duty due to the Duke of Cornwall when a number of stannary towns were authorised by royal decree. A document of 1396 examined by Charles Henderson shows that the old form "Hellys" was still in use The manor of Helston in Kerrier was one of the seventeen Antiqua maneria of the Duchy of Cornwall. The seal of the borough of Helston was St Michael his wings expanded and standing on a gateway. The two towers domed upon the up-turned dragon, impaling it with his spear and bearing upon his left arm an escutcheon of the arms of England, viz Gu three lions passant guardant in pale Or, with the legend "Sigillum comunitatis helleston burg".

It is a matter of debate as to whether Helston was once a port, albeit no actual records exist. A common belief is that in the 13th century Loe Bar formed a barrier across the mouth of the River Cober cutting the town off from the sea. Geomorphologists believe the bar was most likely formed by rising sea levels, after the last ice age, blocking the river and creating a barrier beach. The beach is formed mostly of flint and the nearest source is found offshore under the drowned terraces of the former river that flowed between England and France, and now under the English Channel.

Daniel Defoe describes Helston (1725) in his tour around Great Britain thus, ″This town is large and populous, and has four spacious streets, a handsome church, and a good trade: this town also sends members to Parliament.''' He also mentions that the River Cober makes a tolerable good harbour and several ships are loaded with tin, although over one hundred years before Defoe, Richard Carew (1602) described Loe Bar as "The shingle was relatively porous and fresh water could leave and seawater enter depending, on the relative heights of the pool and sea". (part of the author's The Natural History of England, or, A description of each particular county) Defoe's description seems to be the first and possibly the origin of other sources claiming Helston to be a port in the historic period. Loe Pool is referred to in a document of 1302, implying the existence of Loe Bar at this date, if not much earlier, and thus precluding the passage of shipping up the Cober.  At the same time it was recorded that the burgesses of Helston exercised jurisdiction over the ships anchored at Gweek, but no mention was made of ships at Helston, and no customs records or other documentation of port traffic relating to Helston survives; thus confirming the fact that Gweek has for centuries been the recognized port of Helston. There is no known archaeological evidence for the existence of a port at Helston* and there is no primary evidence to support Defoe’s account.

However, contributing to the belief of a port at Helston was the discovery of what some people believe to be slipways and mooring rings, during excavations around 1980.Kittridge, Alan, 1989 Cornwall's Maritime Heritage. Twelveheads Press There was no known shipping from the sea after 1260, but before 1200, in 'the 1182 record of Godric of Helleston paying a fine of ten marks for exporting his corn out of England from Helston without a licence.' This could be considered the most significant piece of documentary evidence signifying Helston's former port days, though it does not prove the case. At the time of Domesday Book, Gweek had no inhabitants whilst Helston was the largest settlement in the west of Cornwall, with 113 households. In 1837 a plan was drawn up to open Loe Pool to shipping using a pier to counteract siltation, but it was never carried out.

The site of Helston Castle is now a bowling green near the Grylls Monument, which has been there since 1760. The castle was built in 1280 as a simple stone structure for Edmund, Earl of Cornwall. By 1478 it had fallen into disuse and ruin.

Government

The Helston parliamentary constituency was created in 1298 and elected two members to the Unreformed House of Commons; the Reform Act 1832 reduced the number elected to one. Helston is now part of the St Ives constituency, which covers the western part of Cornwall and the Isles of Scilly. The current member is the Conservative, Derek Thomas. Prior to Brexit in 2020, Helston was within the South West England European Parliamentary Constituency. At local government level, the town is administered by Cornwall Council and Helston Town Council. Helston is split into three Cornwall Council wards: Helston South, Helston North, and Porthleven and Helston West. Helston Town Council is based at the Helston Guildhall which was completed in 1839.

Geography
Helston is situated along the banks of the River Cober in Cornwall. Downstream is Cornwall's largest natural lake Loe Pool, formed when a shingle bar blocked the mouth of the river by rising sea levels forming a barrier beach. To the south is the Lizard Peninsula, an area important for its complex geology and wildlife habitats.

Transport
Helston is on the A394 road. To the west, the A394 leads to Penzance; to the north-east it leads to Penryn where it joins the A39, which leads south to Falmouth and north-east to Truro. The B3297 runs north from Helston to Redruth.Ordnance Survey: Landranger map sheet 204 Truro & Falmouth  The nearest railway station is Redruth on the Cornish main line, although the Helston branch line railway served the town until closure in the early 1960s. The Helston Railway Preservation Company is undertaking the restoration of part of the line. Bus services now link Helston to the rail network; First Kernow provides the (U4) bus service from Penzance station to Falmouth via Helston. The (34) bus service links Redruth station with Lizard via Helston and is operated by Go Cornwall Bus. This is the main commercial airport for Cornwall with regular scheduled services to many parts of the UK.

Climate
Helston has an oceanic climate (Köppen climate classification Cfb), similar to the rest of the British Isles. It is one of the mildest places in the country and frosts are rarely severe. The nearest Met Office weather station is RNAS Culdrose, approximately 1 mile south-east of the town centre. Snow occurs in median every second year, almost in 2 – 3 days in line or one alone, most often in January or February.

Culture and community

Flora Day: the Furry Dance and Hal-an-Tow ceremonies
Flora Day occurs annually, on 8 May (except when the date falls on a Sunday or Monday — Monday being Market Day — when it is the preceding Saturday) Helston hosts the Furry Dance.

There are four dances throughout the day, the first starting at 7 a.m. (historically for domestic servants), the ladies in summer frocks and the gentlemen in white shirts and dark grey trousers with neckties bearing the town crest, loaned for the day. The second dance at 9.50 is when children from the town's schools dance dressed all in white, the individual schools denoted by the head dresses that the girls wear. The premier dance follows at Midday when the "gentry of the County" dance, the ladies in long ball-type gowns topped off with picture hats and the gentlemen wearing full morning dress. The final dance of the day begins at 5 p.m., a dance historically for the tradespeople of the town.  Participants in this dance are the only dancers to dance around the town twice, having already danced in the 7 a.m. dance.

Only Helston-born people can dance in the lead set in each dance and the first male and female will only lead that dance once in their lifetime. Flora Day is administered by Stewards who elect stewards therefore continuing this wonderful occasion without outside interference. Helston Town Band play the famous tune and accompany all four dances on a long route around the town. The dwellings and shops of the town are festooned with bluebells, campions and whatever green foliage is available. Specific dances (not including the children's dance) go into and out of various private buildings, shops and grounds. The origins of the dance are not known but appear to represent a pre-Christian celebration of the passing of winter.

On the same day the "Hal an Tow", another celebration of the coming of spring, is performed upon the streets of the town.  This is a morning ritual that is traditionally more boisterous than the dance. It is a moving street theatre that appears to have its origins in the Middle Ages, and the themes tend to be more English than uniquely Cornish. The theatre consists of the Hal-an-tow song accompanied by dancing and acting out the content of the verses. The costumes and the song itself represent many different historical and mythical themes. It has evolved over time, the most recent verse (about St Piran) only appeared within the 21st century.

Hellys International Guitar Festival
In 2017, a new festival was established by the lutenist Ben Salfield and his promoters, Kernow Concerts, bringing international concert artists from the world of guitar music from as far away as Los Angeles to perform concerts and give free lessons in Helston each August. The festival is initially based in The Old Cattle Market, next to Coronation Park and Boating Lake, and features some of the best artists in their field.

Helston Town Band

Helston Town Band has a rich history, which can be traced back to the turn of the 20th century. Indeed, there are members of the current band whose family connections extend back four generations. Inevitably, during the War the band reformed with new members and in 1946 numbers were consolidated when most of its pre-war members returned from active service. The band enjoyed steady progress at this time, which culminated in 1951 when it reached the National Third Section Finals at Belle Vue, Manchester.

In 1967, the band came under the direction of Edward Ashton, with whom the band gained much success and a reputation for consistently playing music to a high standard. Edward led the band to numerous successes in both local and regional contests, until his retirement in November 2002 after an incredible 35 years.

Following his retirement, the band appointed John Hitchens as their new Musical Director . The band has continued to flourish under John’s direction: in 2003, they were crowned Cornish First Section Champions, and in 2004 they gained promotion to the National First Section.

In 2006, the band were crowned West of England First Section Champions, and received an invitation to compete in the National First Section Finals in Harrogate, where they achieved a commendable seventh place. The band went on to achieve third place at the West of England First Section Championships in 2007, and were delighted to become West of England First Section Champions once again in 2008.

These excellent results meant that Helston Town Band earned promotion and competed in the Championship Section in 2009 for the first time in its history.

Churches and places of interest

There are several churches including St Michael's Church, a humble church with stained-glass windows and a tall bell tower which can be heard throughout the town. In the surrounding graveyard there is a monument to Henry Trengrouse, the inventor of the rocket fired safety line — a device for aiding in the saving of lives in a shipwreck.

Helston is also the birthplace of Bob "Ruby Robert" Fitzsimmons, the first triple world boxing champion. The house where he was born and lived in Helston is still standing and is indicated by a plaque above the door.

The Helston Museum, founded in 1949, occupies the building originally designed as the town's Market House in 1837, with two separate buildings—one for butter and eggs, the other the meat market. The exhibits are mostly concerned with Helston's agricultural and market town history. The museum also hosts art exhibitions and has a shop selling all things Cornish.

There are three Cornish crosses in Helston: one in Cross Street and two in Mr. Baddeley's garden (Cross Street). One of the latter crosses was removed from Tresprison, Wendron, and other from near Trelill Holy Well, Wendron. The cross from Trelill has ornament on the front and back of the shaft.

The Grylls Monument, at the end of Coinagehall Street was built by public subscription in 1834 to thank Humphry Millet Grylls, a local banker, who stopped the closure of Wheal Vor, a local mine that at the time employed over a thousand people.

Helston also hosts The Flambards Experience, formerly the Helston Aero Park, which is a theme park with a selection of rides together with a few remaining aviation exhibits. Nearby Wendron is home to the Poldark Mine theme park, where visitors can go underground into the old workings. The Helston Railway, which aims to restore the Helston Branch, is also nearby.

Schools
Helston Community College has the most pupils in Cornwall. Its South Site building was formerly (1939-1972) Helston Grammar School. Formerly located at Penrose Road (which became the secondary modern school), the grammar school had a long history dating back to the 16th century. Derwent Coleridge was a headmaster there, and his pupils included Charles Kingsley, John Duke Coleridge, Richard Edmonds, Thomas Rowe Edmonds, John Rogers, Henry Trengrouse and James Trevenen.The further alumni are cited as Helston students in ODNB articles on them. Another former headmaster was the botanist and author Charles Alexander Johns (1843–47), who was also a former pupil.

The School Houses in grammar school days were Coleridge, Kingsley and Tennyson. Alfred Tennyson's local connection was through his writing.

Helston has three primary schools. These are Parc Eglos, St. Michael's and Nansloe. The catchment area of Helston Community College includes these and many other schools from the surrounding villages. There is also a primary school at Trannack. All four primary schools dance on Flora Day, as does Helston Community College.

Sport and recreation

In 1885 the annual custom of the beating the Helston Borough Bounds was undertaken, followed by a scrimmage for 15 dozen buns and the throwing of the hurling ball. In the same year Helston Cycling Club had their headquarters at the Globe Hotel and had a weekly evening cycle to places such as Redruth and the Lizard.

The town has an active sporting scene, with Helston RFC, Helston Athletic FC and Helston Cricket Club all having prominent roles within the community. The current rugby club was formed in 1965 but rugby was played on Helston Downs as early as 1883 when Helston beat Lanner by 6 tries and 3 touch-downs in self-defence to nil. The Swallows Gymnastics Club is also extremely popular within the area. Helston holds an annual road race An Resek Helys (The Race for Helston) and an annual triathlon.

The town has a King George V Playing Field, the home ground for the rugby club and finish line of An Resek Helys. Below the town is Coronation Park which has a man-made lake as its centrepiece where rowing boats can be hired in summer. A skate park is nearby in the same complex. The Penrose Amenity Area lies across the road from Coronation Park. National Trust-owned, this area, once part of the Penrose Estate, offers walks alongside the River Cober which leads down to Loe Pool and the sea beyond Loe Bar. Just off the main path is a bird-watching hide offering views over Loe Pool.

Twinning
Helston is twinned with the following towns:
 Sasso Marconi, Bologna, Italy
 Plougasnou, Brittany, France

Local newspapers
Helston is served by two local paid-for newspapers, The West Briton and [[Packet Newspapers|The Packet]]: both offer a selection of news and local pictures. The area is also covered by a free delivered newspaper, the Helston Advertiser established in April 2000.

Notes

References

Further reading

External links

 Helston Town Council
 Helston Museum
 Cornwall Record Office Online Catalogue for Helston

 
Civil parishes in Cornwall
Cornish Killas
Manors in Cornwall
Market towns in Cornwall
Towns in Cornwall